[[File:1920 poster 12000 Jewish soldiers KIA for the fatherland.jpg|thumb|An RJF leaflet, published in 1920.
Inscription at the top:
To the German mothers!
On the tomb: 
12,000 Jewish soldiers fell on the field of honor for the fatherland. 
And below:
Christian and Jewish heroes fought side by side and rest side by side in foreign land. 12,000 Jews were killed in action! Furious party hatred does not stop at the graves of the dead. German women, do not tolerate that a Jewish mother is scorned in her grief.
Reich Federation of Jewish Front-Line Soldiers (Registered Association)]]

The Reich Federation of Jewish Front-Line Soldiers (RJF) was an organization of German-Jewish soldiers founded in February 1919 by Leo Löwenstein in the aftermath of World War I to demonstrate Jewish loyalty to the former German Empire and German nationalism. 

History
The goal of Reichsbund jüdischer Frontsoldaten was to stop the spread of antisemitism based on the argument that Jews were disloyal to the countries they lived in.  In 1918, German antisemites  claimed that the Jews had stabbed Germany in the back (Dolchstosslegende).

The Reichsbund emphasized that 85,000 Jewish soldiers had fought for the German Empire in World War I, and 12,000 had died, which placed their loyalty to Germany beyond any reasonable doubt. Jews had received 30,000 medals and awards during the war. At its high point the Reichsbund had 55,000 members.

The Reichsbund regarded the German Reich as the mother country of all German Jews. Its activities were outlawed by the Nazi government in 1936, and in 1938 it was dissolved.

The group stated: "The RJF sees the basis of its work as complete allegiance to the German homeland. It does not have any goal or desire outside of this German homeland, and sharply rejects any movement which wishes to bring us German Jews to a position of outsiders in relation to this German homeland."

References

 Further reading
Ulrich Dunker: Der Reichsbund jüdischer Frontsoldaten 1919 -1938. Geschichte eines jüdischen Abwehrvereins. Droste, Düsseldorf 1977 
Hans-Christian Kokalj: "Kampf um die Erinnerung". Jüdische Frontkämpfer des Ersten Weltkriegs und ihr Widerstand gegen die rechtspopulistische Propaganda in der Weimarer Republik.'', in: Tobias Arand (Hg.), Die "Urkatastrophe" als Erinnerung. Geschichtskultur des Ersten Weltkriegs, Münster 2006, S. 81-98 
English notes on Heroische Gestalten Jüdischen Stammes (Erwin Löwe, Berlin 1937)

Jewish political organizations
Jewish anti-Zionism in Germany
Jewish anti-Zionist organizations
Jewish German history
Opposition to antisemitism in Germany
Organizations established in 1919
Organizations disestablished in 1938
1919 establishments in Germany
1938 disestablishments in Germany
German veterans' organisations
Jewish Nazi German history
Jewish organisations based in Germany